The following is a list of subcamps of the Sachsenhausen concentration camp established by Nazi Germany. During World War II the prisoners included Germans, Poles, Soviet POWs, Roma, and later Jews. It is estimated that the number of victims of Sachsenhausen was 30,00035,000. Dozens of subcamps of Sachsenhausen existed directly in the capital city, serving individual business operators and factories.

Sub-camps
 Bad Saarow
 Beerfelde in Steinhöfel
 Berlin Arado-Werke (Preußen/Berlin, Arado-Werke/Flugzeugwerke) 
 Berlin-Hakenfelde (Preußen/Berlin, Luftfahrtgerätewerk/Siemens), 1,000 women 
 Berlin-Halensee (Preußen/Berlin, DEMAG) 
 Berlin-Haselhorst Siemensstadt (Preußen/Berlin, Siemens/Schuckertwerke AG), 700 women 
 Berlin-Haselhorst Siemensstadt (Preußen/Berlin, Siemens/Schuckertwerke AG), 1,400 men 
 Berlin Kastanienallee (Preußen/Berlin, Waffen-SS), 150 men 
 Berlin-Köpenick (Preußen/Berlin, Kabelwerk Oberspree der AEG), 1,200 women  
 Berlin-Köpenick (Preußen/Berlin, Kabelwerk Oberspree der AEG), men  
 Berlin-Lichtenrade (Preußen/Berlin, Luftschutzbauten / Feuerlöschteichen), men  
 Berlin-Lichterfelde (Preußen/Berlin, Reichssicherheitshauptamt), 1,500 men  
 Berlin-Mariendorf (Preußen/Berlin, Maschinenbau-Henschel), 650 women  
 Berlin-Marienfelde  
 Berlin-Moabit  
 Berlin-Moabit (Friedrich-Krause-Ufer)  
 Berlin-Müggelheim  
 Berlin-Neukölln  
 Berlin-Niederschöneweide  
 Berlin-Reinickendorf  
 Berlin-Spandau  
 Berlin-Südende  
 Berlin-Tegel  
 Berlin-Tegel  
 Berlin-Wilmersdorf  
 Berlin-Wilmersdorf (Kommandoamt der Waffen-SS)  
 Berlin-Zehlendorf  
 Berlin-Zehlendorf  
 Bernau bei Berlin
 Biesenthal
 Börnicke in Nauen
 Brandenburg an der Havel
 Brüx
 Döberitz in Dallgow-Döberitz
 Drögen-Niendorf

 Falkenhagen in Falkensee
 Fürstenwalde
 Fasterweide (?)
 Genshagen in Ludwigsfelde
 Glau in Trebbin
 Groß Rosen (initially a subcamp, became its own camp in 1941)
 Hohenlychen in Lychen
 Karlsruhe in Plattenburg
 Kleinmachnow
 Königs Wusterhausen
 Kolpin
 Küstrin
 Lieberose
 Lübben

 Müggelheim in Berlin
 Neubrandenburg
 Neudamm
 KZ Neuengamme (initially a subcamp, became its own camp in 1940) 
 Oranienburg (early camp, replaced by KZ Sachsenhausen; re-established in 1943)
 Pölitz
 Prettin
 Rathenow
 Riga
 Schönwalde-Glien
 Schwarzheide
 Senftenberg
 Storkow
 Stuttgart
 Syrets (near Babi Yar, Kyiv; intended to be a subcamp)
 Tettenborn
 Treuenbrietzen (was a subcamp of Ravensbrück until 1944)

 Usedom (Peenemünde, V-2 rocket production plant)
 Werder
 Wewelsburg (initially a subcamp, became its own camp in 1941, then became a subcamp of Buchenwald in 1943)
 Wittenberg
Construction labor commandos that detained Poles
 Baubrigade 1 
 Baubrigade 8
 Baubrigade 9
 Baubrigade 10
 Baubrigade 12
 Baubrigade I
 Baubrigade II
 Baubrigade V
 Baubrigade XIII

See also
 List of Nazi-German concentration camps
 Subcamp (SS)

References

Sachsenhausen

Subcamps of Nazi concentration camps